Ingham County is a county located in the U.S. state of Michigan. As of the 2020 Census, the population was 284,900. The county seat is Mason. Lansing, the state capital of Michigan, is largely located within the county. (Lansing is the only state capital in the United States located in a county of which it is not also the seat of government.) The county is home to Michigan State University, Lansing Community College, and the Class A minor league baseball team Lansing Lugnuts. Ingham County is included in the Lansing–East Lansing, MI Metropolitan Statistical Area. It is considered to be a part of Mid Michigan.

History
Ingham County was established by an act of the Michigan Territorial Legislature on October 29, 1829, from portions of Shiawassee County, Washtenaw County and unorganized territory. It was attached for administrative purposes to Washtenaw County until 1838 when county government was established for Ingham.

The county was named for Samuel D. Ingham, the U.S. Secretary of the Treasury under President Andrew Jackson, making Ingham one of Michigan's so-called Cabinet counties.

Geography

The county consists of gently rolling hills with an elevation ranging between 800 and 1,000 feet above sea level.  The highest point in the county is the top of Teaspoon Hill rising to a height of 1,056 feet above sea level 1.5 miles north of Leslie.

The Grand River winds northward along the western boundary of the county and the Red Cedar River flows west across the northern section into the Grand River in Lansing. Most of the midsection of the county drains to the north into the Red Cedar River and the northern tier of townships drain to the south into the Cedar. The Sycamore Creek, flowing northwest into the Red Cedar in Lansing, drains much of the midsection of the county. Most of the southern portion of the county drains south or west into the Grand River. The southeastern corner drains to the southeast into the Huron River via the Portage Creek and Portage River and a series of small lakes.

Adjacent counties
 Shiawassee County (northeast)
 Livingston County (east)
 Washtenaw County (southeast)
 Jackson County (south)
 Eaton County (west)
 Clinton County (north)

Demographics

As of the census of 2010, there were 280,895 people, 111,162 households, and 62,674 families residing in the county. The racial makeup of the county was 76.2% White, 11.8% Black or African American, 0.6% Native American, 5.2% Asian, 0.04% Pacific Islander, 2.3% from other races, and 4.0% from two or more races. 7.83% of the population were Hispanic or Latino of any race.

According to the 2007–2010 American Community Survey 22.8% were of German, 13.2% Irish, 12.5% English and 5.6% Polish ancestry. 88.2% spoke only English, while 3.9% spoke Asian languages and 3.8% Spanish at home.

As of the 2000 Census, there were 108,593 households, out of which 29.80% had children under the age of 18 living with them, 43.00% were married couples living together, 12.10% had a female householder with no husband present, and 41.30% were non-families. 30.20% of all households were made up of individuals, and 7.70% had someone living alone who was 65 years of age or older. The average household size was 2.42 and the average family size was 3.04.

In the county, 23.40% of the population was under the age of 18, 18.50% was from 18 to 24, 28.60% from 25 to 44, 20.10% from 45 to 64, and 9.40% who were 65 years of age or older. The median age was 30 years. For every 100 females, there were 93.30 males. For every 100 females age 18 and over, there were 90.10 males.

The median income for a household in the county was $40,774, and the median income for a family was $53,063. Males had a median income of $40,335 versus $30,178 for females. The per capita income for the county was $21,079. About 8.30% of families and 14.60% of the population were below the poverty line, including 14.60% of those under age 18 and 6.60% of those age 65 or over.

Government
For most of the 20th century, Ingham County was rather conservative for an urban county. From 1900 to 1988, it voted Republican all but three times, in the national Democratic landslides of 1932, 1936 and 1964.

However, the Republican edge narrowed in the 1980s, and the county has gone Democratic at every election since 1992. In recent years, only Wayne County has been more Democratic.

The county government operates the jail, maintains rural roads, operates the major local courts, keeps files of deeds and mortgages, maintains vital records, administers public health regulations, and participates with the state in the provision of welfare and other social services. The 14-member county board of commissioners controls the budget, but has only limited authority to make laws or ordinances due to Michigan's large devolution of local power to cities, villages, and townships.  The county board of commissioners also hires a county administrator/controller who serves as the chief fiscal and administrative officer of the county.

Elected officials
 Prosecuting Attorney: John Dewane (D)
 Sheriff: Scott Wriggelsworth (D)
 County Clerk: Barb Byrum (D)
 Register of Deeds: Derrick Quinney (D)
 County Treasurer: Alan Fox (D)
 Drain Commissioner: Patrick Lindemann (D)

County Board of Commissioners
15 members, elected from districts (12 Democrats, 3 Republicans)

55th Judicial District Court
2 judges (non-partisan)
 Judge Donald Allen, Jr.
 Judge Richard Hillman

30th Judicial Circuit Court
9 judges (non-partisan)
General Trial Division
 Judge Joyce Draganchuk, Chief Circuit Judge
 Judge Rosemarie Aquilina
 Judge James Jamo
 Judge Wanda Stokes
Family Division
 Judge Lisa McCormick, Presiding Judge
 Judge Shauna Dunnings, Chief Circuit & Probate Judge Pro Tempore
 Judge Richard Garcia, Judge of Probate
 Judge Carol Koenig
 Judge Morgan E. Cole

Transportation

Air service
 Ingham County is served by Lansing Capital Region International Airport and Mason Jewett Field.

Rail service
 Amtrak
 Canadian National Railway
 CSX Transportation
 Jackson & Lansing Railroad

Bus service
 Capital Area Transportation Authority (CATA)
 Greyhound Lines
 Indian Trails

Highways

Recreational
 Lansing River Trail

Communities

Cities
 East Lansing (part)
 Lansing (part)
 Leslie
 Mason (county seat)
 Williamston

Villages
 Dansville
 Stockbridge
 Webberville

Charter townships
 Delhi Charter Township
 Lansing Charter Township
 Meridian Charter Township

Civil townships

 Alaiedon Township
 Aurelius Township
 Bunker Hill Township
 Ingham Township
 Leroy Township
 Leslie Township
 Locke Township
 Onondaga Township
 Stockbridge Township
 Vevay Township
 Wheatfield Township
 White Oak Township
 Williamstown Township

Census-designated places
 Edgemont Park
 Haslett
 Holt
 Okemos

Other unincorporated communities
 Columbia
 Fitchburg
 Onondaga

Education
School districts include
 Dansville Schools
 East Lansing School District
 Eaton Rapids Public Schools
 Fowlerville Community Schools
 Haslett Public Schools
 Holt Public Schools
 Lansing Public School District
 Leslie Public Schools
 Mason Public Schools
 Morrice Area Schools
 Northwest School District
 Okemos Public Schools
 Perry Public School District
 Springport Public Schools
 Stockbridge Community Schools
 Waverly Community Schools
 Webberville Community Schools
 Williamston Community Schools

The Michigan School for the Blind, a state-operated school, was formerly in Lansing.

Michigan State University is in the county.

Notes

See also

 List of Michigan State Historic Sites in Ingham County, Michigan
 National Register of Historic Places listings in Ingham County, Michigan

References

External links
 Ingham County
 Capital Area District Library (serving all of Ingham County except East Lansing)
 

 
Lansing–East Lansing metropolitan area
Michigan counties
1838 establishments in Michigan
Populated places established in 1838